The Roland System-100M was a modular analog synthesizer manufactured by the Roland Corporation in the late 1970s and early 1980s. It was the successor of the Roland System-100, a semi-modular keyboard.

In the 1980s, shortly after its introduction, Richard Burgess of Landscape called the 100M "one of the best synthesisers on the market, with so many control functions available independently, whereas most synths only have one or two LFOs to do all the modulating."  Ian Boddy considered the System 100M "an almost ideal introduction to the world of modular synthesis," and praised its oscillator sync sound, especially when sampled to fake analog modular polyphony.

By the 1990s, although digital synthesizers were starting to replace analog ones, several prominent musicians still enthused about their 100Ms.  Jack Dangers of Meat Beat Manifesto said "the best thing about it is that it's modular and it uses a patchbay, so you can send things back on themselves and get, like, analogue feedback, you really can... You can do cross-modulation, too. It's pretty good for external sound sources, as well."  Chris Carter called it "as versatile, expandable, and affordable a system as you can get without going the DIY route."

Components

New Modules

2020 Clones
The original Roland schematics being fully available online, Behringer has planned respective released their own versions (either straight copies or adaptions) of the Roland 100M series of modules in Eurorack format. As of July 2020, the following modules are available for (pre-)ordering:
 110 VCO/VCF/VCA
 112 Dual VCO
 121 Dual VCF
 130 Dual VCA
 140 Dual Envelope/LFO
 150 Ring Mod/Noise/S&H/LFO
 172 Phase Shifter/Delay/LFO
 173 Quad Gate/Multiples
 182 Sequencer
 297 Dual Portamento/CV Utilities (combination of 132 Dual CV / Audio Mixers & Voltage Processors & 165 Dual Portamento Controller)
 305 EQ/Mixer/Output (combination of 131 Output Mixer / Tuning Oscillator / Headphone Amp & 174 Parametric EQ)

Notable users 

 Aphex Twin
 Ian Boddy
 Chris Carter
 Vince Clarke
 The Human League
 Landscape
 Meat Beat Manifesto

References

External links 

 Vintage Synth Explorer - Roland System 100m
Sound On Sound retrospective
Module descriptions
M185 from RYK Modular

Modular synthesizers
System-100M
Analog synthesizers
Polyphonic synthesizers